Déjate Amar may refer to:

Déjate Amar (album), 2001 album by Jenni Rivera
"Déjate Amar", 1982 song by Guillermo Dávila
"Déjate Amar", 1994 song by La India from the album Dicen Que Soy
"Déjate Amar", 2005 song by Intocable
"Déjate Amar", 2013 song by Yandel from the album De Líder a Leyenda